Saint Brigid's Church is an 18th-century Catholic church in Straffan, Ireland.

Location

St. Brigid's Church is located in the centre of Straffan village, 900 m (½ mile) north of the River Liffey.

History

St. Brigid's Church bears a foundation stone with the date "1786" and the church was consecrated on 28 August 1788. The gates outside were added . St. Brigid's was renovated in 1913–15, with a Gothic Revival altar in white and red marble added, as well as the stained-glass windows in the west (probably by Joshua Clarke and Sons).

The church was renovated in 1986 and rededicated by Archbishop of Dublin Kevin McNamara.

Art and music

The church contains:
Pentecost, a painting by Patrick Pye
St Brigid Feeding the Poor, painting by Evie Hone
an ambo, baptismal font and ambry pillar sculpted by Mark Ryan
Ambry constructed by Jarlath Daly
a Crucifixion triptych by Katsuya

There is also a two-manual pipe organ. Originally built in Derby in 1914, it was moved to Straffan and rebuilt by Stephen Adams in 2019.

Above the altar is a coved ceiling with acanthus-leaf centrepiece encircled by grape-laden vine tendrils. There are stucco hoodmouldings around the windows with ornamental stops.

Building

St. Brigid's Church is a three-bay Catholic church on a T-shaped plan.

References

Religion in County Kildare
Roman Catholic churches in County Kildare
1786 establishments in Ireland
Roman Catholic churches completed in 1860
19th-century churches in the Republic of Ireland